The Bickley Baronetcy, of Attleborough in the County of Norfolk, was a title in the Baronetage of England. It was created on 3 September 1661 for Francis Bickley. The title became extinct on the death of the fifth Baronet in 1752.

Bickley baronets, of Attleborough (1661)
Sir Francis Bickley, 1st Baronet (c. 1582–1670)
Sir Francis Bickley, 2nd Baronet (c. 1623–1681)
Sir Francis Bickley, 3rd Baronet (1644–1687)
Sir Francis Bickley, 4th Baronet (1667–1746)
The Reverend Sir Humphrey Bickley, 5th Baronet (d. 1752 b. Attleborough 17 Aug 1752

References

George Edward Cockayne, The Complete Baronetage vol. III page 229

Extinct baronetcies in the Baronetage of England